Whitefield may refer to:

Places

India
 Whitefield, Bangalore, a neighbourhood of Bangalore
 Whitefield (Bangalore) railway station

United Kingdom
 Whitefield, Dorset, England, a United Kingdom location
 Whitefield, Greater Manchester, England
 Whitefield tram stop
 Whitefield, Perthshire, Scotland, birthplace of the writer James Browne
 Whitefield, Somerset, England, a United Kingdom location

United States
 Whitefield, Illinois, an unincorporated community
 Whitefield, Maine, a town
 Whitefield, New Hampshire, a town
 Whitefield (CDP), New Hampshire, a census-designated place and main village in the town
 Whitefield, Oklahoma, a town
 Whitefield Township, Marshall County, Illinois
 Whitefield Township, Kandiyohi County, Minnesota

People 
 Whitefield (surname), a list of people
 Whitefield Bentley (1884–1952), Canadian politician
 Whitefield J. McKinlay (1852–1941), American teacher, state legislator and real estate businessman

Schools 
 Whitefield College (disambiguation)
 Whitefield Academy (disambiguation)
 Whitefield School, a secondary school and sixth form in the London Borough of Barnet
 Whitefield Schools, a special school in Walthamstow in the London Borough of Waltham Forest
 Whitefield Christian Schools, Toronto, Ontario, Canada

See also 
 Whitefield Park, a former football ground in Cambuslang, Scotland
 Whitfield (disambiguation)